Greatest Hitz may refer to:

 Greatest Hitz (Limp Bizkit album)
 Greatest Hitz (Soulja Slim album)